Eleanor Lynn (October 29, 1916 – December 26, 1996) was an American actress who was known for both movies and theater. Her films include The Magician's Daughter (1938), Fugitives for a Night (1938) and As Husbands Go (1933). She left Hollywood to star in the Broadway production of the Clifford Odets play Rocket to the Moon (1938), as a member of the Group Theatre in New York City.

Filmography

References

External links

 
 
 

1916 births
1996 deaths
20th-century American actresses
American film actresses
American stage actresses